Pterostylis revoluta, commonly known as the autumn greenhood, is a species of orchid endemic to south-eastern Australia. As with similar greenhoods, the flowering plants differ from those which are not flowering. The non-flowering plants have a rosette of leaves flat on the ground but the flowering plants have a single flower with leaves on the flowering spike. This greenhood has white and green flowers that have a long, curved, pointed labellum which extends beyond the sinus between the lateral sepals.

Description
Pterostylis revoluta is a terrestrial, perennial, deciduous, herb with an underground tuber and when not flowering, a rosette of between three and seven greyish to bluish, egg-shaped leaves. The flowers are pale green and white with a brown tinge. The dorsal sepal and petals are fused, forming a hood or "galea" over the column. Flowering occurs from February to June.

Taxonomy and naming
Pterostylis revoluta was first formally described in 1810 by Robert Brown and the description was published in the Prodromus Florae Novae Hollandiae et Insulae Van Diemen. The specific epithet (revoluta) is a Latin word meaning "turned over" or "rolled back".

Distribution and habitat
The autumn greenhood grows on sheltered slopes in forest and in coastal scrub in coastal and near-coastal area from south-east Queensland to Nowra in New South Wales and as far inland as Cessnock.

References

revoluta
Endemic orchids of Australia
Orchids of New South Wales
Orchids of Queensland
Orchids of the Australian Capital Territory
Plants described in 1810
Taxa named by Robert Brown (botanist, born 1773)